This is a list of television and radio stations in Saint Petersburg, Russia.

LW Broadcasting

MW Broadcasting

FM 

Note: Radio stations indicated with * does not work on non-Japanese receivers.

TV

External links 
 VictorCity
 Spb TV Radio List
 Radiomap

Saint Petersburg, Television and radio stations
Entertainment in Saint Petersburg
Saint Petersburg, Television and radio stations
Saint Petersburg, Television and radio stations
Saint Petersburg-related lists
Mass media in Saint Petersburg
Saint Petersburg, Television and radio stations